Marampa Mines is the site of an hematite iron ore mine based in the town of Lunsar, Port Loko District, Sierra Leone.

Railway 

The mine is connected to the port at Port Pepel by an 84 km long  gauge railway.  This railway is experiencing problems with the theft of its track, and other obstructions.

Mine 

In September 2008, the mine at Marampa was sold to Cape Lambert Iron Ore.

In 2012 Cape Lambert Resources decided to sell the mine. In 2013 Cape Lambert requested a mining license for the mine. At the moment (August 2014) the mine is still available for sale.

See also 

 Transport in Sierra Leone
 Railway stations in Sierra Leone

References 

Populated places in Sierra Leone